Explicit knowledge (also expressive knowledge) is knowledge that can be readily articulated, codified, stored and accessed. It can be expressed in formal and systematical language and shared in the form of data, scientific formulae, specifications, manuals and such like. It is easily codifiable and thus transmittable without loss of integrity once the syntactical rules required for deciphering it are known.  Most forms of explicit knowledge can be stored in certain media. Explicit knowledge is often seen as complementary to tacit knowledge.

Examples  
The information contained in encyclopedias and textbooks are good examples of explicit knowledge. The most common forms of explicit knowledge are manuals, documents, procedures, and how-to videos. Knowledge also can be audio-visual. Engineering works and product design can be seen as other forms of explicit knowledge where human skills, motives and knowledge are externalized. 

In the scholarly literature, papers presenting an up-to-date "systemization of knowledge" (SoK) on a particular area of research are valuable resources for PhD students.

See also
 Descriptive knowledge
 SECI model of knowledge dimensions
 Tacit knowledge

References

External links
 National Library for Health - Knowledge Management Specialist Library - collection of resources about auditing intellectual capital.

Knowledge